Ryan Wedding (born 14 September 1981) is a Canadian former snowboarder. He competed in the men's parallel giant slalom event at the 2002 Winter Olympics. In 2010, Wedding was convicted of drug trafficking, which resulted in him being sentenced to four years in prison.

References

External links
 

1981 births
Living people
Canadian male snowboarders
Olympic snowboarders of Canada
Snowboarders at the 2002 Winter Olympics
Sportspeople from Thunder Bay